Persoonia gunnii is a species of flowering plant in the family Proteaceae and is endemic to Tasmania. It is an erect shrub with young branchlets that are hairy at first, spatula-shaped to egg-shaped leaves with the narrower end towards the base, and white to cream-coloured flowers.

Description
Flowering occurs from December to May. The species is sometimes confused with P. muelleri.

Taxonomy
Persoonia gunnii was first formally described in 1847 by the English botanist Joseph Dalton Hooker in W.D. Hooker's London Journal of Botany from specimens collected on the "May-day Plains" by R.C. Gunn.

Populations with characteristics intermediate between P. gunnii and P. muelleri are known from Dove Lake–Cradle Mountain and Adamsons Peak–South Cape localities. Further intermediates with P. muelleri subspecies angustifolia have been recorded from Adamsons Peak, the South Cape Range and the Recherche Bay area in southern Tasmania, but further work is needed to assess their status.

Distribution and habitat
Habitats include alpine heathland, subalpine wet sclerophyll forest and rainforest, on soils composed of and lying over dolerite, quartzite and limestone.

Ecology
Persoonia gunnii is highly sensitive to dieback.

References

gunnii
Flora of Tasmania
Endemic flora of Tasmania
Plants described in 1847
Taxa named by Joseph Dalton Hooker